Denis Carey (3 August 1909 – 28 September 1986) was a British actor who appeared in many film and television roles.

Some of Carey's notable appearances include Dennis Potter's 1968 television series A Beast With Two Backs, Elizabeth R, I, Claudius and The Barchester Chronicles. Carey appeared three times in the BBC science fiction series Doctor Who, including Professor Chronotis in the incomplete serial Shada, as the eponymous Keeper in The Keeper of Traken, and as the old man fake Borad in Timelash.

Carey was born in London, the son of May (née Wilkinson) and William Denis Carey. He was married to actress Yvonne Coulette. He died in London.

Filmography
The Red Shoes (1948) - Dancer
The Queen of Spades (1949) - Dancer (uncredited)
Children of Chance (1949)
Oh... Rosalinda!! (1955) - Dancer
Psychomania (1973) - Coroner's Assistant
The Day of the Jackal (1973) - Casson
Lamb (1985) - Mr. Lamb

References

External links
 

1909 births
1986 deaths
English male film actors
English male television actors
20th-century English male actors